Greenwich is a surname. Notable people with the surname include:

Alex Greenwich (born 1980), Australian activist and politician
Ellie Greenwich (1940–2009), American singer, songwriter, and record producer
Sonny Greenwich (born 1936), Canadian musician